The Viking is a 1928 American drama film. It was the first feature-length Technicolor film that featured a soundtrack, and it was the first film made in Technicolor's Process 3. It stars Pauline Starke, Donald Crisp, and LeRoy Mason. The film is loosely based on the 1902 novel The Thrall of Leif the Lucky by Ottilie A. Liljencrantz. The Viking was directed by Roy William Neill.

Plot
Lord Alwin (LeRoy Mason), Earl of Northumbria, is captured in a Viking raid and taken to Norway as a slave. There he is bought by Helga (Pauline Starke), an "orphan of noble blood" under the guardianship of Leif Ericsson (Donald Crisp). He proves a troublesome slave, and Leif's sailing master, Egil the Black (Harry Woods), prepares to kill him for his insolence, but Helga stops him. When Alwin challenges Egil to a sword fight, Leif is impressed by his courage and permits it. Alwin manages to break Egil's sword, but spares him. Helga then gives Alwin to Leif.

Leif, with the support of King Olaf (Roy Stewart), the first Christian king of Norway, sets out to search for lands beyond Greenland, which was discovered by his pagan father, Eric the Red (Anders Randolf). Back in Greenland, Eric kills one of his men after he discovers that the man is a Christian. When Leif stops there to pick up supplies, Eric gives his blessing for his marriage to Helga (unbeknownst to her). However, after it is revealed that Leif is himself a Christian, Eric disowns him and refuses to give him any supplies. Fighting breaks out after Leif instructs Alwin to take the supplies anyway. In the confusion, Helga stows away on Leif's ship.

Leif has no choice but to take her along. During the voyage, she and Alwin confess their love for each other. Unaware of this, Leif informs her that he will marry her on the "second change of the moon". Egil, in love with Helga himself, foments a mutiny among the crew, who fear sailing off the edge of the world. When Egil prepares to stab Leif in the back during the wedding ceremony, Alwin leaps in the way and is wounded. Leif kills Egil, but is enraged when Helga reveals that she loves Alwin. He raises his sword to kill the unconscious Alwin, but his Christian faith stops him. Just then, land is sighted, and the mutiny dissolves.

Leif steps ashore bearing a makeshift cross. He has a stone tower built and makes friends with the natives. When Leif leaves for home, Alwin, Helga and a few others remain behind. A final, 'modern day,' scene, with God Bless America sung in the background, states that the stone tower still stands in Newport, Rhode Island.

Cast

Production
The Viking was the first feature film to use Technicolor's dye-transfer process because of the technical limitation of the previous process with printing sound, which used two prints cemented base-to-base. The film was considered the finest use of color cinematography at the time of release.

Early sound and color technology
The sound was recorded in the Movietone sound-on-film system originally developed by Fox Film Corporation, with color by Technicolor in their new dye transfer process, now known as Process 3.

The film was produced by the Technicolor Corporation, but was distributed by Metro-Goldwyn-Mayer, after production chief Irving Thalberg became impressed with the technology. The film carries MGM's Leo the Lion logo in color, featuring a different lion (called Telly) than the one (Jackie) shown on black-and-white films. In 1930, MGM reissued the film as a color sound musical film titled The Private Life of Leif Ericson. The sound film survives today as well as the silent version.

Reception

Critical response
Film critic Mordaunt Hall of The New York Times wrote in his review: "the figures often look as if they had stepped out of an opera comique…. The make-up of the players is often more than a trifle overdone, especially when the villain reveals on close inspection his mouse-colored eyelids."

In 1938, Technicolor president Herbert Kalmus wrote:
There seemed to be two principal troubles with The Viking, both of which I suspected but without certainty. First it came out among the very last silent pictures in 1929, and second, whiskers. Leif Ericson, the Viking hero true to character had a long curling mustache, whereas American audiences prefer their lovers smooth-shaven. At times the whole screen seemed filled with Viking whiskers.

Film historians Sheldon Hall and Steve Neale wrote in their book Epics, Spectacles, and Blockbusters: "The Viking was neither a talkie nor a musical", as the other two Technicolor films of "the late 1920s and early 1930s".

See also
 List of films featuring slavery

References

Citations

Sources

External links
 
 
 
 
 Technicolor - a history of the colour process, including information about The Viking.

1928 films
1920s color films
American historical romance films
American romantic drama films
American silent feature films
1920s historical romance films
Fictional Vikings
Films based on American novels
Films directed by Roy William Neill
Films set in the Viking Age
Films set in the 11th century
Films set in England
Films set in Greenland
Films set in pre-Columbian America
Films set in Rhode Island
Metro-Goldwyn-Mayer films
Silent films in color
Cultural depictions of Erik the Red
Cultural depictions of Leif Erikson
Early color films
1928 romantic drama films
1920s American films
Silent romantic drama films
Silent adventure films
Silent American drama films
1920s English-language films
Silent historical romance films